Åsa IF is a Swedish football club located in Åsa.

Background
The club was formed following a meeting at the Åsa lantmannaförening (Asa Farmers' Association) on 21 March 1919. The club was named Ölmevalla Gymnastik- och Idrottsförening but this was changed in 1932 to Åsa Idrottsförening.

Åsa IF currently has around 900 members, mainly comprising children and young people living in Åsa which located on the west coast, 20 kilometers south of Kungsbacka. AIF's activities are intended for all who are interested in the sports of table tennis, football and bandy. The club arranges events such as Åsacupen, Åsakalset and Bingo.

Åsa IF currently plays in Division 4 Halland Elit which is the sixth tier of Swedish football. They play their home matches at the Åsa IP in Åsa.

The club is affiliated to Hallands Fotbollförbund.

Season to season

References

External links 
 Åsa IF – Official website
 Åsa IF Dam on Facebook

Football clubs in Halland County
1919 establishments in Sweden
Association football clubs established in 1919